Per Oscar Swartz (December 1, 1959) is a Swedish entrepreneur, writer and blogger.

Oscar Swartz was born in Solna, Stockholm County. He is the great-grandson of the former Swedish Prime Minister Carl Swartz, and a second cousin of the publisher Eva Swartz and the journalist Richard Swartz. He has a doctorate in economics and managerial economics from the Stockholm School of Economics. In 1994 he founded Bahnhof, the first independent Internet service provider in Sweden. He left the company in 2004 after some internal disputes.

Since July 2005 he runs the blog Texplorer where he covers issues such as information technology, freedom and integrity on the Internet, file sharing and intellectual property. He has authored two reports, published by the Swedish liberal free market think tank Timbro, on these issues. He is a member of the Swedish Pirate Party.

Swartz is openly gay. In 1995 he co-founded the magazine QX, which is today the largest magazine for LGBT people in Scandinavia.

References

External links
 Oscar Swartz – Texplorer, blog

1959 births
Living people
Swedish gay writers
Writers from Stockholm
Stockholm School of Economics alumni
Swedish bloggers
Swedish businesspeople
Swedish political writers
Pirate Party (Sweden) politicians
Male bloggers